Élisabeth Terroux (1759–1822) was a Swiss painter active in Russia.

Terroux was born in Geneva and trained under Jean-François Favre. She became a popular miniature painter and travelled to Russia where she was active for Catherine II. Her self-portrait was shown at the Paris Exposition Universelle (1878), "Les Portraits nationaux", palais du Trocadéro.

Terroux died in Geneva.

References

1759 births
1822 deaths
18th-century artists from the Republic of Geneva
19th-century Swiss painters
19th-century Swiss women artists
Miniature painting